Colón Department may refer to:

Colón Department (Honduras)
Colón Department, Entre Ríos, Argentina
Colón Department, Córdoba, Argentina 
Colón Department (Colombia)

See also
Colón (disambiguation)
Department (administrative division)

Department name disambiguation pages